Events in the year 1957 in Bulgaria.

Incumbents 

 General Secretaries of the Bulgarian Communist Party: Todor Zhivkov
 Chairmen of the Council of Ministers: Anton Yugov

Events 

 22 December – Parliamentary elections were held in Bulgaria.

Sports 

 7 November – The 1957 Bulgarian Cup Final (the 17th final of the Bulgarian Cup) was contested between Levski Sofia and Spartak Pleven at the Vasil Levski National Stadium in Sofia. Levski won the final 2–1.

References 

 
1950s in Bulgaria
Years of the 20th century in Bulgaria
Bulgaria
Bulgaria